Roderique Aloysius Victor (born 2 November 1988) is a Namibian rugby union player for the  in the Currie Cup and the Rugby Challenge. His regular position is flanker or hooker.

Rugby career

Victor was born in Lüderitz (then in South West Africa, but part of modern-day Namibia).

References

External links
 

Namibian rugby union players
Living people
1988 births
People from Lüderitz
Rugby union flankers
Rugby union hookers
Namibia international rugby union players
People educated at Windhoek High School
RCJ Farul Constanța players
Welwitschias players